From its admittance as a state in 1890 to 1913 Idaho was represented in the United States House of Representatives by one at-large representative.  After the 1910 census Idaho was awarded a second seat starting with the 63rd Congress in 1913.  However both seats continued to be elected at-large on a general ticket until the election of 1918.  Since that year the state has allocated two districts for its representatives.

List of members representing the district

References 

 Congressional Biographical Directory of the United States 1774–present

At-large
Former congressional districts of the United States
At-large United States congressional districts
Constituencies established in 1890
1890 establishments in Idaho
Constituencies disestablished in 1919
1919 disestablishments in Idaho